Simon Beccari (born 18 November 1998) is an Italian professional footballer who plays as a goalkeeper for WSG Tirol.

Career
Born in Italy, Beccari moved to Austria at a young age. He is a youth product of the academies of Matrei, SV Innsbruck, and WSG Swarovski Tirol. He made his professional debut with WSG Swarovski Tirol in a 2–0 Austrian Bundesliga loss to Rapid Wien on 16 February 2020. After his debut in 2020, he mostly played for Tirol's reserve side in the Austrian Regionalliga.

Personal life
Aside from football, Beccari also helps run a series of goalkeeping training camps for youths from South Tyrol.

References

External links
 
 WSG Profile
 OEFB Profile
 ESPN Profile

1998 births
Living people
Sportspeople from Bolzano
Italian footballers
Association football goalkeepers
Austrian Football Bundesliga players
Austrian Regionalliga players
WSG Tirol players
Italian expatriate footballers
Italian expatriate sportspeople in Austria
Expatriate footballers in Austria
Footballers from Trentino-Alto Adige/Südtirol